Laurent Coq (born 22 February 1970) is a French jazz pianist and composer.

Life and career
Coq began playing the piano at the age of seven. He studied at the Centre d'informations musicales in Paris, at which time he also played in a trio with bassist Jules Bikôkô bi Njami and drummer Daniel Garcia Bruno, and in a variety of other bands. Coq was awarded a government grant in 1994 to travel to the U.S., where he studied with pianists Bruce Barth, John Hicks and Mulgrew Miller.

Coq's 2011 album Rayuela, co-led with saxophonist Miguel Zenón, was inspired by Julio Cortázar's novel of the same title. The Down Beat reviewer commented that "Rayuela experiments with song structures and the connections between tunes to express emotions and motifs each artist observed by reading the [book]".

Discography
An asterisk (*) indicates that the year is that of release.

As leader/co-leader

References

1970 births
French jazz pianists
French male pianists
Living people
21st-century pianists
21st-century French male musicians
French male jazz musicians
Enja Records artists
Sunnyside Records artists